Areeta is an underground station on line 1 of the Bilbao metro. It is located in the neighborhood of Areeta, in the municipality of Getxo. The station opened as part of the metro on 11 November 1995, replacing an older overground station.

History 
The station, then known as Las Arenas, first opened to the public in 1887 as the western terminus of the Bilbao-Las Arenas railway. It was an at-grade station, covered by a large train shed. The station was originally built as a cul-de-sac, but after the extension of the line to Plentzia in 1893, it was renovated as trains continued along the coast past the station. The station had two side platforms and was one of the most important train stations of the entire railway.

Starting in 1947, the narrow-gauge railway companies that operated within the Bilbao metropolitan area were merged to become Ferrocarriles y Transportes Suburbanos, shortened FTS and the first precedent of today's Bilbao metro. In 1977, the FTS network was transferred to the public company FEVE and in 1982 to the recently created Basque Railways. In the 1980s it was decided the station, just like most of the former railway line, would be integrated into line 1 of the metro, with the new station opening underground now as part of the metro network on 11 November 1995.

The new underground station was designed by English architect Norman Foster. Concurrently, it was renamed Areeta, following the Basque language orthographic rules and in replacement of the former Las Arenas name, which was in Spanish.

Station layout 

It is an underground station with a single island platform.

Access 

   1, Langileria street
  1, Gabriel Aresti street
   Station's interior

Services 
The station is served by line 1 from Etxebarri to Plentzia. The station is also served by regional Bizkaibus bus services.

References

External links
 

Line 1 (Bilbao metro) stations
Railway stations in Spain opened in 1887
Railway stations in Spain opened in 1995
1995 establishments in the Basque Country (autonomous community)
Getxo